Soletron was a social networking and ecommerce platform in lifestyle retail verticals. It is headquartered in Fort Lauderdale, Florida and holds offices in Philadelphia, New York City, and California.  Their revenue model is similar to Etsy.

Formation
Soletron was founded in September 2010 by former Merrill Lynch bankers A.J. Steigman and Shane Robinson with the goal of becoming a social networking and ecommerce company. In March 2011 they launched their blog and their app debuted in October 2011. Their ecommerce platform was established in December 2011.

General information
The Soletron platform is designed to facilitate the interaction between consumers and independent brands. Soletron has a structure similar to Etsy as it does not hold any inventory. Sellers sign up through the website to post their inventory online. Soletron brings a social element to retail as users can create profiles to follow brands or other members. They can also favorite products and share them with the online community. Soletron features a lifestyle blog meant to keep their visitors up to date on sneakerhead trends.

Soletron is known for launching the first ever sneakerhead comic book as part of their marketing efforts and have been deemed a source of authority for the community. They cater mainly to sneakerheads and streetwear consumers, that are between the ages of 15-25.

In November 2012, the company transitioned into a full content platform for the youth community.

Soletron was acquired in July 2014, by its industry leader and the world's largest global streetwear retailer Karmaloop, for an undisclosed amount.

Statistics
Soletron hosts as many as 300,000 unique monthly visitors and makes 9,000,000 impressions per month. This company has an online presence in over 200 countries. As of February 2013, the company had over 200,000 Twitter followers and 100,000 Facebook fans.

Brands
Nooka and Dunkelvolk are two among dozens of brands featured on Soletron's e-commerce platform. Through these brands, they currently have over 1,200 products available on the site.

Advisory board

Soletron's advisory board consists of the following individuals:
Bruce Chizen (Former CEO of Adobe Systems)
Santonio Holmes (Super Bowl MVP and current member of the New York Jets)
Tom Austin (Founder of AND1)
John Friedman (Founder of Easton Capital)
Bob Rice (Founder of Tangent Capital and Bloomberg Contributor)

Press and accolades
Soletron has been highlighted in CNBC, Reuters, Huffington Post, Business Insider, and Bloomberg TV.

References 

Companies based in Fort Lauderdale, Florida